"The City of Soul" is a song by Eurogliders, released in August 1985 as the second single from their third studio album, Absolutely! (1985). The song peaked at number 19 on the Australian Kent Music Report.

Track listing
7" Single
Side A "The City of Soul"
Side B "When The Stars Come Out"

12" Single
Side A	"The City of Soul" (The Pugwash [For the People] Extended Mix) - 5:46
Side B "The City of Soul" (Single Mix)
Side B "When The Stars Come Out"

Chart performance

References 

1985 singles
Eurogliders songs
1985 songs
CBS Records singles